William Nobles may refer to:

William Nobles (cinematographer), American cinematographer
William H. Nobles, military officer, businessman, and politician

See also
William Noble (disambiguation)